The FBI Ten Most Wanted Fugitives is a most wanted list maintained by the United States's Federal Bureau of Investigation (FBI). The list arose from a conversation held in late 1949 between J. Edgar Hoover, Director of the FBI, and William Kinsey Hutchinson, International News Service (the predecessor of the United Press International) editor-in-chief, who were discussing ways to promote capture of the FBI's "toughest guys". This discussion turned into a published article, which received so much positive publicity that on March 14, 1950, the FBI officially announced the list to increase law enforcement's ability to capture dangerous fugitives. The first person added to the list was Thomas J. Holden, a robber and member of the Holden–Keating Gang on the day of the list's inception.

Individuals are generally only removed from the list if they are captured, die, or if the charges against them are dropped; they are then replaced by a new entry selected by the FBI. In eleven cases, the FBI removed individuals from the list after deciding that they were no longer a "particularly dangerous menace to society". Machetero member Víctor Manuel Gerena, added to the list in 1984, was on the list for 32 years, which was longer than anyone else. Billie Austin Bryant spent the shortest amount of time on the list, being listed for two hours in 1969. The oldest person to be added to the list was Eugene Palmer on May 29, 2019, at 80 years old. On rare occasions, the FBI will add a "Number Eleven" if that individual is extremely dangerous but the Bureau does not feel any of the current ten should be removed. Despite occasional references in the media, the FBI does not rank their list; no suspect is considered "#1 on the FBI's Most Wanted List" or "The Most Wanted".

The list is commonly posted in public places such as post offices. Some people on the list have turned themselves in. On May 18, 1996, after surrendering at the U.S. embassy in Guatemala City, Leslie Isben Rogge became the first person on the FBI Ten Most Wanted Fugitives list to be apprehended due to the FBI's then-new home page on the Internet. The FBI maintains other lists of individuals, including the FBI Most Wanted Terrorists, along with crime alerts, missing persons, and other fugitive lists.

On June 17, 2013, the list reached a cumulative total of 500 fugitives having been listed. As of January 9, 2023, 529 fugitives had been listed, eleven of them women, and 494 of them were captured or located (93%), 163 (31%) of them due to public assistance.

New additions
The Criminal Investigative Division (CID) at FBI Headquarters calls upon all 56 Field Offices to submit candidates for the FBI's "Ten Most Wanted Fugitives" list. The nominees received are reviewed by special agents in the CID and the Office of Public Affairs. The selection of the proposed candidates is forwarded to the Assistant Director of the CID for their approval and then to the FBI's Director for final approval. This process takes some time, which is why James Joseph "Whitey" Bulger Jr., who was arrested in Santa Monica, California on June 22, 2011, remained on the list until May 9, 2012, despite no longer being at large. Osama bin Laden similarly remained on the list for almost a year after his death at the hands of U.S. forces on May 2, 2011.

List as of March 2023

Rewards are offered for information leading to capture of fugitives on the list; the reward is a minimum of $100,000 for all fugitives.

See also

 Former FBI Ten Most Wanted Fugitives
 List of Mexico's 37 most-wanted drug lords
 Specially Designated Global Terrorist
 Operation Flagship

References

External links

 
 
 Ten most wanted fugitives list is turning 65 years old—FBI news blog
 Additional information from America's Most Wanted

 
1950 establishments in the United States